PVN can refer to:

 An abbreviation for paraventricular nucleus of the hypothalamus
 The Padvinders Vereniging Nederland (Pathfinder Association the Netherlands), one of the Scouting organisations that evolved into the Scouting Nederland
 Polyvinyl nitrate
 P. V. Narasimha Rao, former Prime Minister of India
 Peter van Nieuwenhuizen, Dutch physicist and co-discoverer of supergravity
 Petrovietnam national oil corporation of Vietnam 
 Pirates versus Ninjas
 Pazov Vitaliy Nikolaevich